Lechosław Marszałek (9 March 1922–26 March 1991) was a Polish animated film director and script writer. He is best known as the creator of Reksio; he was also involved with the Bolek i Lolek cartoons. For many years he was involved with the Studio Filmów Rysunkowych. He has been called "one of Poland's greatest pioneers of animation."

References

External links
 Tribute page at SFR, a company he worked for
  Licencja na Reskia, a longer biography
 Awards listed at the Polish Theater Encyclopedia

1922 births
1991 deaths
Polish animators
Polish animated film directors
Polish television directors
Recipient of the Meritorious Activist of Culture badge